Ducommun Incorporated is a technology-driven manufacturing company that designs, engineers and builds complex electronic systems, large contoured Aerostructures and high reliability engineered products and aftermarket services for global aerospace, defense, military and space markets.

Founded in 1849, Ducommun is recognized as the oldest continuously operating business in California and today manufactures structural and electronic components, sub-assemblies and engineered products for a wide range of commercial, military and space platforms including the Boeing 737 NG and 787 airliners, Airbus A320 and Airbus A220 airliners, Joint Strike Fighter (JSF) and F/A-18 fighter jets,  C-17 heavy lift cargo jet, and the Apache, Chinook and Black Hawk helicopter platforms. 

Ducommun's integrated products and solutions for U.S. and International Space programs have been featured on Mars Rovers, the International Space Station (ISS), Frontiers Mission to Jupiter, Space Shuttle Program, CASSINI, COWVR,  Dream Chaser, Rosetta, Venus Express, Hubble Rescue, INMARSAT, ISS Dextre Robot, Mexsat,  MILSTAR, Sentinel 6, Osiris-Rex and Europa Clipper. In 2020, Ducommun engineers built three customized Motion Control Devices called Variable Reluctance Resolvers (VRRs) for use on the Mars 2020 Mission Perseverance Rover.

Ducommun designs and manufactures complex electronic systems and sub-assemblies for advanced missile programs and platforms, and provides engineering and program management services to the United States Military, the United States Department of Homeland Security, NASA and other government agencies. Ducommun's approximately 2,500 employees work at its 16 manufacturing centers located in California, Arkansas, Arizona, Kansas, Oklahoma, Missouri, New York, Wisconsin and Thailand. Its corporate headquarters is based in Santa Ana, California.

History 

Ducommun was established in 1849 by Charles Louis Ducommun, a watchmaker by training, who emigrated to the United States from Switzerland in the early 1840s. The Company started as a general store, providing supplies and credit to gold prospectors and other pioneers who had settled in the burgeoning pueblo of Los Angeles. At the time, California was still a territory of the United States, just on the verge of statehood with the population of Los Angeles then standing at just about 1,600. The store had a public "circulating library", lending books if paid in full with a full refund upon return.

In 1857 Charles Louis Ducommun married Bertha Rontex, of San Francisco, and they had a baby girl the next year. In 1873 he was an officer of the Royal Arch Masons, Los Angeles Chapter No. 33. They built a "mansion" at 527 Lazard Street, east of Alameda Street, south of Aliso Street, and about 1875 their street was renamed "Ducommun Street". In 1892 their vacant "mansion" was donated and converted into the "News' and Working Boys' Home", a woman-run charity, formerly on First Street, which charged $1.50 per week for room, board, and laundry. In 1900, the Boy's Home moved to San Pedro Street and the mansion was donated to the First Congregational Church of Los Angeles repurposed as a "men's boarding house", called the "Bethlehem Hotel" from the Bethlehem Institutes (nearby, corner of Vignes and Ducommun Streets) under the supervision of the Rev. Dr, Dana W. Bartlett. In 1902 a new Bethlehem Men's Hotel was built on Vignes Street, and this mansion became a "Japanese lodging house."
 
In the 1890s he was a stockholder and member of the board of directors of Farmers and Merchants Bank of Los Angeles, of which Isaias W. Hellman was president. Ducommun kept pace with the growth of the southern California economy, and in 1907 incorporated as The Ducommun Hardware Company, evolving into a value added-distributor of metals provided by the Eastern mills. This coincided with the emergence of a defense-based industry, e.g., munitions and shipbuilding, as the country entered World War I, and during the 1920s the arrival of general aviation. Charles Albert Ducommun, one of Charles Louis Ducommun's four sons, decided early on to support an innovative aircraft designer named Donald Douglas, marking the beginning of the Company's longstanding partnership with what was to become the aerospace industry. Symbolic of this new relationship, Ducommun tubular steel flew in 1927 on the Ryan-designed Spirit of St. Louis during Charles Lindbergh's historic transatlantic flight from Long Island's Roosevelt Field to Paris.

Ducommun became a more prominent distributor during World War II, inventorying large quantities of stainless steel, carbon steel, and alloys, mostly to support the production of bomber and fighter aircraft that were used in both the European and Pacific theaters. Following the war, the Company joined its customers in the aircraft industry's transition to making long-distance passenger aircraft such as the Lockheed Constellation and, just as importantly, their commitment to the Space Age. Under the leadership of Charles Emil Ducommun (the grandson of Charles Louis Ducommun, and son of Charles Albert), the Company went public in 1949 having become the leading metal materials distributor in the West, and Alcoa's largest distributor nationwide. Over the next 15 years, Ducommun diversified to support the needs of an aircraft industry that was rapidly incorporating more electronic components. With the acquisition of Kierulff Electronics in the early 1960s and the distribution business of Texas Instruments in 1981, Ducommun became a national force in the distribution of electronic components and subsystems. Charles Ducommun retired as the company's chairman in 1978.

The 1980s were years of restructuring and change. Both the metals and electronics distribution businesses were sold as the Company retrenched having suffered punishing losses, coming very close to bankruptcy by 1987. It had reoriented itself to become a member of the aerospace industry supply chain with the acquisition of four small companies that fabricated metal parts, and that in one case manufactured switches for aircraft cockpit instrument panels. In 1987 Norman Barkeley, a seasoned aerospace executive and recently retired chief executive officer of Lear Siegler, joined the Ducommun board of directors, and the following year became the company's chairman. Barkeley's leadership restored the company's growth and profitability, and with five targeted acquisitions established the footing for the progress of the next decade. He retired as Chairman Emeritus in 1998, and was succeeded by Joe Berenato who had been the company's chief financial Officer for six years before becoming its president and chief operating officer.

Berenato built upon the stable platform established by Barkeley, both through acquisition and the investment in process capability, which, in turn, have helped the company win important new programs. The enablement provided by the acquisition of Composite Structures, Miltec, WiseWave, CMP, and most recently DynaBil Industries, and the companywide application of Lean and Six Sigma to manufacturing, engineering, and administrative processes has resulted in the profitable doubling of revenues since the year 2000.

Faulty parts dispute with Boeing 
In 2000, Boeing convened an internal audit team to investigate quality control and regulatory compliance problems with parts manufactured by Ducommun. The parts in question were manufactured in the company's Gardena, California factory, and were installed on as many as 300 Boeing 737 NG aircraft built from 1994. In the audit, Boeing alleged that Ducommun's factories failed to produce parts using the specified processes and tolerances, and recommended that the relationship with Ducommun be re-evaluated. The audit committee also recommended that Boeing should seek financial recourse. Although the company stated that no such payment was made, Ducommun did ultimately agree to repay $1.6 million to Boeing as compensation for manufacturing problems and overbilling.

A 2010 documentary by Al Jazeera alleged that in three plane crashes involving 737 NGs – Turkish Airlines Flight 1951, American Airlines Flight 331 and AIRES Flight 8250 – the aircraft's fuselage broke up following impact with the ground because of defective structural components supplied by Ducommun. However, the accident investigations in all three cases did not highlight any link between post-impact structural failures and manufacturing issues.

References

External links
Ducommun Company history

Companies listed on the New York Stock Exchange
Companies established in 1849
Companies based in Los Angeles County, California
Carson, California
1849 establishments in California